Lincoln Township is one of twelve townships in White County, Indiana, United States. As of the 2010 census, its population was 638 and it contained 278 housing units.

Geography

Unincorporated towns
 Idaville at 
(This list is based on USGS data and may include former settlements.)

Adjacent townships
 Cass Township (north)
 Jackson Township (east)
 Adams Township, Carroll County (southeast)
 Jefferson Township, Carroll County (southwest)
 Union Township (west)
 Liberty Township (northwest)

Cemeteries
The township contains these three cemeteries: Leazenby, Mitchell and State View.

School districts
 Twin Lakes School Corporation

Political districts
 Indiana's 2nd congressional district
 State House District 16
 State Senate District 07

References
 United States Census Bureau 2007 TIGER/Line Shapefiles
 United States Board on Geographic Names (GNIS)
 IndianaMap

External links
 Indiana Township Association
 United Township Association of Indiana

Townships in White County, Indiana
Townships in Indiana